Paul Guillaume (1891 in Paris – 1934 in Paris) was a French art dealer. Dealer of Chaïm Soutine and Amedeo Modigliani, he was one of the first to organize African art exhibitions. He also bought and sold many works from cutting-edge artists of the time, such as Henri Matisse, Constantin Brâncuși, Pablo Picasso, and Giorgio de Chirico.

Life 

Being from modest origins, Paul Guillaume worked first in a garage in Montmartre and then in his gallery in Paris. In his gallery he presented and sold especially the works of Amedeo Modigliani, who painted several portraits of him.

He found African sculptures which he displayed. This aroused the attention of Guillaume Apollinaire (whom he met in 1911), who in turn introduced him to many of the artists of the beginning of the century in France. He soon organized important exhibitions, such as the Première Exposition d’Art Nègre et d’Art Océanien, on 13–19 May 1919, with a catalogue by Henri Clouzot and additional text by Apollinaire. Apollinaire, who died the previous year, had also collaborated with Paul Guillaume on the pioneering study Sculptures Nègres in 1917. This exhibition – drawn from Guillaume's private collection – placed African art at the heart of Modernism.

After his death, his wife Domenica married architect Jean Walter and continued Guillaume's collection, selling his most "extreme" paintings and acquiring impressionist paintings. After her own death, this collection of 20th-century paintings became part of the Musée de l'Orangerie in Paris.

Domenica was once accused of the murder of Paul Guillaume, who died early and suspiciously. Some speculate that she was cleared of all charges in exchange for giving the collection to the French state after her death.

References

External links

1891 births
1934 deaths
French art dealers
French art collectors
Art collectors from Paris